Qaradağlı (also, Karadagly) is a village in the Khachmaz Rayon of Azerbaijan.  The village forms part of the municipality of Qaradağ Buduq.

References 

Populated places in Khachmaz District